London has one of the largest concentrations of universities and higher education institutions in the world. It has 40 higher education institutions (not counting foreign Universities with London branches) and has a student population of more than 400,000. Among the institutions in London are some of the old colleges that today make up the federal University of London, modern universities, as well as a number of smaller and often highly specialised universities and colleges. Additionally, over 45,000 students in over 180 countries follow the University of London External System, established in 1858.

Major universities 

Major universities are considered to be those included as universities in at least two of the three national rankings of universities.

Key (lower numbers are better):
GUG: Guardian University Guide 2018 (published 2017)
TUG: Times and Sunday Times Good University Guide 2018 (published 2017)
CUG: Complete University Guide 2018 (published 2017)
UoL: Part of the University of London
QS: ranking in QS World University Rankings 2018 
THE: ranking in Times Higher Education World University Rankings 2017/2018 
RG: Russell Group, a self-selected association of 24 large British public research universities
ARWU: ranking in Academic Ranking of World Universities 2017

Notes:
a Imperial College London, was a college of the University of London but left in 2007.

Branches of UK Universities in London

 Anglia Ruskin University
 Coventry University London and CU London
 Glasgow Caledonian University London
 Loughborough University London
 Newcastle University London
 Northumbria University London
 Staffordshire University London
 Sunderland University London
 Teesside University London
 Warwick Business School London
 Ulster University London Campus
 University of the West of Scotland London
 York St John University London Campus

Specialised and private universities and higher education colleges 
The following institutions offer British undergraduate and postgraduate courses, but are usually specialised in one or two academic fields.

Colleges which form the federal University of London are in italics.

 Academy of Live and Recorded Arts (Drama) - Wandsworth
 Architectural Association School of Architecture
 Bird College (Dance) - Sidcup
 BPP University (Business, Law, Healthcare) - Holborn/Waterloo/Shepherd's Bush/City of London
 British College of Osteopathic Medicine (Medicine) - Finchley Road
 British School of Osteopathy (Medicine) - Newington
 Royal Central School of Speech and Drama (Drama) - Swiss Cottage
 City of London College - Whitechapel
 Conservatoire for Dance and Drama (Circus/Dance/Drama) - made up of a range of institutions, those in London are: 
 Central School of Ballet - Clerkenwell
 London Academy of Music and Dramatic Art - Barons Court 
 London Contemporary Dance School - Bloomsbury
 National Centre for Circus Arts - Shoreditch
 Rambert School of Ballet and Contemporary Dance - St Margarets
 Royal Academy of Dramatic Art - Fitzrovia
 Courtauld Institute of Art (History of Art) - Aldwych
 Drama Centre (Drama) - King's Cross
 Drama Studio London (Drama) - Uni of West London, London
 Ealing, Hammersmith and West London College - Acton/Ealing/Hammersmith/Southall
 ESCP Europe (Business School) London Campus - Finchley Road
 EThames Graduate School (Business) - Gants Hill
 Glion Institute of Higher Education (Hospitality Management) - Roehampton
 Greenwich School of Management (Business, Law) - Greenwich/Greenford
 Guildhall School of Music and Drama (Music/Drama) - City of London
 Hult International Business School
 Holborn College (Business/Law) - Holborn
 ICMP (The Institute of Contemporary Music Performance) - Kilburn
 Institute of Cancer Research (Oncology) - South Kensington
 Islamic College for Advanced Studies - Kilburn Park
 Istituto Marangoni (Fashion/Design) - Spitalfields
 Kensington College of Business (Business) - Kensington
 London Business School (Postgraduate Business School) - Regent's Park
 "London School of Science and Technology"
London Business E-School (Business/Engineering) - Finchley Central/Brunswick Park
 London College of Accountancy (Accounting) - Upper Edmonton
 London College of Business (Business) - Ilford/Barking
 London College of Business Management & Information Technology (Business/IT) - North Cheam, opposite St. Anthony's Hospital
 London School of Business and Finance (Business/Finance/Marketing) - Holborn/City of London
 London School of Business and Management (Business/IT/Postgraduate) - Fitzrovia
 London School of Commerce (Postgraduate Business School) - Borough
 London School of Hygiene and Tropical Medicine (Medicine) - Fitzrovia
 London School of Osteopathy (Osteopathy) - Southwark
 London School of Theology (Theology) - Northwood
 London Studio Centre (Dance and theatre) - North Finchley
 Mont Rose College of Management and Sciences (Business/Management/Hospitality) - Ilford
 Mountview Academy of Theatre Arts (Drama) - Wood Green
 Open University - Camden Town
 Pearson College (UK) - Holborn
 Polish University Abroad (Speech, applied psychology, dietetics & public health) - Hammersmith
 Ravensbourne (Broadcasting/Fashion/Design/Postgraduate) - North Greenwich
 Regent's University London - Regent's Park, range of schools including:
 Regent's Business School London (Business)
 European Business School London (Business with Languages)
 London School of Film, Media & Performance (Film/Media)
 School of Psychotherapy & Counselling Psychology (Psychology)
 Rose Bruford College (Drama) - Sidcup
 Royal Academy of Dance (Dance) - Battersea
 Royal Academy of Music (Music) - Marylebone
 Royal Central School of Speech and Drama  (Drama and theatre) - Hampstead
 Royal College of Art (Art/Design) - Kensington
 Royal College of Music (Music) - Kensington
 Royal Veterinary College (Veterinary) - King's Cross
 SAE Institute (Technology) - Haggerston/Dalston
 School of Advanced Study (Research-led Postgraduate Specialisms) - Fitzrovia
Institute of Advanced Legal Studies
Institute of Classical Studies
Institute of Commonwealth Studies
Institute of English Studies
Institute of Modern Languages Research
Institute of Historical Research
Institute of Latin American Studies
Institute of Philosophy
Warburg Institute
 St George's, University of London (Medicine) - Tooting Broadway
 St Patrick's College - Stratford
 Trinity Laban Conservatoire of Music and Dance (Music/Dance) made up of Trinity College of Music and Laban Dance Centre - Greenwich/Deptford/New Cross
 University College of Football Business (Sport) - Wembley Stadium
 University of Law (Law, Business, Policing, Psychology, Education, Computing)
 University of International Innovations - Tower Hill
 Williams College (undergraduate, postgraduate, professional and English courses)
 Waltham International College
 The Art Academy London (Foundation, Diplomas, Certificates in fine art)

Foreign universities
A number of foreign university institutions operate in London without Royal Charters. Some are bona fide universities with their degrees validated by recognised accreditation bodies abroad or in the UK, while others are not validated at all or are validated by unrecognised accreditation agencies.

Many foreign universities run study-abroad programmes based in London, but these are often restricted to students who spend the majority of their degree studying at the university campus in their own country, and are not independent university campuses. Some of the colleges offering foreign degrees in London are listed below.
 Booth School of Business, University of Chicago
 Boston University
 Brigham Young University
 Center for Transnational Legal Studies, Georgetown University
 Paris Dauphine University
 Fordham University
 Jagiellonian University
 Limkokwing University of Creative Technology
 New York University
 Northeastern University – London 
 University of Notre Dame
 Richmond, The American International University in London
 Schiller International University
 Syracuse University

See also
Armorial of UK universities
Education in London
Education in England
List of universities in the United Kingdom
United Hospitals

References

External links 
 Study London: The official website for London's universities and higher education colleges - provides an impartial guide to studying in London

London
 
Universities
 
 
London